Frohman is a surname. Notable people with the surname include:

Charles Frohman (1856–1915), American theatrical producer
Daniel Frohman (1851–1940), American theatrical producer
Dov Frohman, Israeli engineer
Gustave Frohman (1854–1930), American theatrical producer
Jesse Frohman, American photographer
Lorne Frohman, American television writer
Philip H. Frohman (1887–1972), American architect

See also
Froman